Gracie Bowers Pfost (March 12, 1906 – August 11, 1965) was the first woman to represent Idaho in the United States Congress, serving five terms as a Democrat in the House of Representatives. Pfost represented the state's 1st district from 1953 to 1963.

Early years
Born in an Ozark Mountain log cabin in Harrison, Arkansas, Pfost was five when her parents moved to a farm near Boise, Idaho, in 1911. One of five siblings, she quit Meridian High School at 16 in 1922 and worked as a milk analyst at a dairy in Nampa. The next year she married her supervisor, Jack Pfost, who was more than twice her age. She graduated from Link's Business College in Boise in 1929.

Pfost entered politics in Canyon County; she held several positions in county government between 1929 and 1951, including deputy county clerk, auditor, recorder of deeds, and county treasurer. She also served as an Idaho delegate to all Democratic National Conventions between 1944 and 1960. The Pfosts ran a real estate business in the 1940s and into the 1950s.

Congress
In 1950, Pfost ran for Congress and won the Democratic nomination over Harry Wall of Lewiston, but narrowly lost to Republican John Travers Wood, a physician from Coeur d'Alene. In 1952, she defeated former eight-term Congressman Compton White, Sr. of Clark Fork in the Democratic primary and unseated Wood in another close general election. Pfost was reelected in 1954, 1956, 1958, and 1960. The "Hell's Belle" of Congress, she was a moderately liberal Democrat, who earned her nickname in her first year, fighting for a large federal dam on the Snake River in Hells Canyon. After years of debate, the single high dam was ultimately defeated and built as a three-dam complex (Brownlee, Oxbow, Hells Canyon) by the local private utility, Idaho Power.

Source:

Run for Senate
Though her House seat was considered secure, the death of Henry Dworshak in July 1962 prompted Pfost to run for his seat in the U.S. Senate. She was the Democratic nominee in the special election, but was narrowly defeated (51%-49%) by the appointed Republican incumbent, former Governor Len Jordan. The election took place shortly after the Cuban Missile Crisis of late October; Jordan was re-elected in 1966 and retired at the end of that term, in early 1973.

Pfost's congressional seat was won by six points by Democrat Compton White, Jr. of Clark Fork, the 41-year-old namesake son of the late eight-term congressman. Idaho's other House seat also went to young Democrat, as 33-year-old Ralph Harding of Blackfoot won a second term. Idaho's other U.S. Senate seat (class 3) was also on the ballot, with 38-year-old Democrat Frank Church of Boise re-elected to the second of four terms.

To date, Dworshak's seat (class 2), earlier held by William Borah for over three decades, has been continuously held by Republicans for over seventy years (since October 1949), and Idaho has yet to elect a woman to the U.S. Senate.

Death
After leaving the House in 1963, Pfost remained in Washington and worked in the Federal Housing Administration as a special assistant on housing for the elderly. She was hospitalized in Washington with pneumonia in October and a few months later at
Johns Hopkins Hospital in Baltimore, Maryland. Later diagnosed with Hodgkin's disease, Pfost was admitted to Johns Hopkins Hospital several times in 1965, and died there on August 11 at age 59.

Pfost's husband Jack (1883–1961) died of a heart attack four years earlier, at her Washington office during her last term in Congress. They did not have children and are buried at Meridian Cemetery in Meridian, Idaho, near her parents, William L. and Lily E. Wood Bowers, and other family members.

See also
 Women in the United States House of Representatives

References

External links

U.S. House of Representatives History – Gracie Bowers Pfost (1906–1965)
University of Idaho Library – Gracie (Bowers) Pfost (1906–1965), papers: 1950–1962

|-

1906 births
1965 deaths
20th-century American politicians
Methodists from Idaho
County officials in Idaho
Deaths from cancer in Maryland
Deaths from Hodgkin lymphoma
Democratic Party members of the United States House of Representatives from Idaho
Female members of the United States House of Representatives
People from Harrison, Arkansas
People from Meridian, Idaho
People from Nampa, Idaho
Women in Idaho politics
Businesspeople from Idaho
20th-century American women politicians